Europrop can refer to:

 Europrop TP400, a military turboprop engine
 Europrop International, makers of the Europrop TP400